Ahmed Lazreg (born 25 September 1934) is a Moroccan middle-distance runner. He competed in the men's 800 metres at the 1960 Summer Olympics.

References

1934 births
Living people
Athletes (track and field) at the 1960 Summer Olympics
Moroccan male middle-distance runners
Olympic athletes of Morocco
Place of birth missing (living people)